Psephos: Adam Carr's Electoral Archive is an online archive of election statistics, and claims to be the world's largest online resource of such information. Psephos is maintained by Dr Adam Carr, of Melbourne, Australia, a historian and former aide to Australian MP Michael Danby and Senator David Feeney. It includes detailed statistics for presidential and legislative elections from 182 countries, with at least some statistics for every country that has what Carr considers to be genuine national elections.

"Psephos" is a Greek word meaning "pebble", a reference to the Ancient Greek method of voting by dropping pebbles into urns, and is the root of the word psephology, the study of elections.

Carr began accumulating Australian election statistics in the mid-1980s, with the intention of publishing a complete print edition of Australian national elections statistics dating back to 1901. With the advent of the World Wide Web, Carr abandoned this idea and began to place election statistics at his personal website. In 2001 he founded Psephos, and began to include statistics from other countries. He has also included historical statistics, such as figures for all U.S. presidential elections and for British House of Commons elections since 1900.

In 2015 Carr added a complete archive of election statistics for the Australian state of Victoria, dating back to 1843.

Psephos is more noted, however, for locating less easily accessible statistics and placing them online. These include constituency-level figures for Japanese legislative elections, which are not available in English anywhere else on the internet, and figures from countries as obscure as Andorra, Equatorial Guinea, São Tomé and Príncipe and Tuvalu. These figures are obtained from a variety of sources, including government election websites, media websites and political party websites. Increasingly, statistics are sent directly to Carr by psephologists, academics and political activists in the countries concerned.

The archive also includes Carr's original electoral maps at constituency level for a number or countries, including Australia, Canada, France, Germany, India, Japan, Mexico and the U.S.

Matthew M. Singer, a specialist in election studies at Duke University, wrote:
Psephos: Adam Carr's Electoral Archive is maintained by Australian journalist Adam Carr and contains election results for 163 countries as well as many sub-national entities. While not all the results are at the district level, in many cases the Psephos archive is the only online source for electoral data (especially for small countries). Another strength of the Psephos archive is that while many national-sources remove the links to previous election results as the new elections approach, the Psephos archive does not delete old-election results. 
This archive, however, has two small drawbacks. First, small parties are often compiled into an "Other" category that for some studies, especially those interested in representation, political fragmentation, or the success of ethnic or gender parties, is a potential problem. Second, like the University of Essex data, the results in the Psephos archive are presented with each candidate/party in a given district presented in a unique row. As a result, scholars must convert the data to a spreadsheet and then data manipulation, often a considerable amount, is required to make analysis of trends at the district level possible.
Despite these drawbacks, the Psephos archive is an invaluable source of electoral data cross-sectionally and over time.

References

External links
Psephos: Adam Carr's Election Archive

Internet properties established in 2001
Online archives
Elections
Australian political websites
Psephology